In chemical thermodynamics, the fugacity of a real gas is an effective partial pressure which replaces the mechanical partial pressure in an accurate computation of the chemical equilibrium constant. It is equal to the pressure of an ideal gas which has the same temperature and molar Gibbs free energy as the real gas.

Fugacities are determined experimentally or estimated from various models such as a Van der Waals gas that are closer to reality than an ideal gas.  The real gas pressure and fugacity are related through the dimensionless fugacity coefficient .

For an ideal gas, fugacity and pressure are equal and so .

The fugacity is closely related to the thermodynamic activity. For a gas, the activity is simply the fugacity divided by a reference pressure to give a dimensionless quantity. This reference pressure is called the standard state and normally chosen as 1 atmosphere or 1 bar.

Accurate calculations of chemical equilibrium for real gases should use the fugacity rather than the pressure. The thermodynamic condition for chemical equilibrium is that the total chemical potential of reactants is equal to that of products. If the chemical potential of each gas is expressed as a function of fugacity, the equilibrium condition may be transformed into the familiar reaction quotient form (or law of mass action) except that the pressures are replaced by fugacities.

For a condensed phase (liquid or solid) in equilibrium with its vapor phase, the chemical potential is equal to that of the vapor, and therefore the fugacity is equal to the fugacity of the vapor. This fugacity is approximately equal to the vapor pressure when the vapor pressure is not too high.

Pure substance
Fugacity is closely related to the chemical potential . In a pure substance,  is equal to the Gibbs energy  for a mole of the substance, and

Gas
For an ideal gas the equation of state can be written as 

where  is the ideal gas constant. The differential change of the chemical potential between two states of slightly different pressures but equal temperature (i.e.) is given by
where ln p is the natural logarithm of p.

For real gases the equation of state will depart from the simpler one, and the result above derived for an ideal gas will only  be a good approximation provided that (a) the typical size of the molecule is negligible compared to the average distance between the individual molecules, and (b) 
the short range behavior of the inter-molecular potential can be neglected, i.e., when the molecules can be considered to rebound elastically off each other during molecular collisions. In other words, real gases behave like ideal gases at low pressures and high temperatures. At low temperatures, molecules are more likely to stick together instead of rebounding elastically.

The ideal gas law can still be used to describe the behavior of a real gas if the pressure is replaced by a fugacity , defined so that

and

That is, at low pressures  is the same as the pressure, so it has the same units as pressure. The ratio

is called the fugacity coefficient.

If a reference state is denoted by a zero superscript, then integrating the equation for the chemical potential gives

Numerical example: Nitrogen gas (N2) at 0 °C and a pressure of  atmospheres (atm) has a fugacity of  atm.

For nitrogen at 100 atm, which is less than the ideal value  because of intermolecular attractive forces. Finally, the activity is just  without units.

Condensed phase 

The fugacity of a condensed phase (liquid or solid) is defined the same way as for a gas:

and

It is difficult to measure fugacity in a condensed phase directly; but if the condensed phase is saturated (in equilibrium with the vapor phase), the chemical potentials of the two phases are equal. Combined with the above definition, this implies that 

When calculating the fugacity of the compressed phase, one can generally assume the volume is constant.

This fraction is known as the Poynting factor. Using , where  is the fugacity coefficient,

This equation allows the fugacity to be calculated using tabulated values for saturated vapor pressure. Often the pressure is low enough for the vapor phase to be considered an ideal gas, so the fugacity coefficient is approximately equal to 1.

Unless pressures are very high, the Poynting factor is usually small and the exponential term is near 1. Frequently, the fugacity of the pure liquid is used as a reference state when defining and using mixture activity coefficients.

Mixture
The fugacity is most useful in mixtures. It does not add any new information compared to the chemical potential, but it has computational advantages. As the molar fraction of a component goes to zero, the chemical potential diverges but the fugacity goes to zero. In addition, there are natural reference states for fugacity (for example, an ideal gas makes a natural reference state for gas mixtures since the fugacity and pressure converge at low pressure).

Gases

and

where  is the partial pressure of component . The partial pressures obey Dalton's law:

The fugacities commonly obey a similar law called the Lewis and Randall rule:

where  is the fugacity that component  would have if the entire gas had that composition at the same temperature and pressure. Both laws are expressions of an assumption that the gases behave independently.

Liquids
In a liquid mixture, the fugacity of each component is equal to that of a vapor component in equilibrium with the liquid. In an ideal solution, the fugacities obey the Lewis-Randall rule:

This is a good approximation when the component molecules have similar size, shape and polarity.

In a dilute solution with two components, the component with the larger molar fraction (the solvent) may still obey Raoult's law even if the other component (the solute) has different properties. That is because its molecules experience essentially the same environment that they do in the absence of the solute. By contrast, each solute molecule is surrounded by solvent molecules, so it obeys a different law known as Henry's law. By Henry's law, the fugacity of the solute is proportional to its concentration. The constant of proportionality (a measured Henry's constant) depends on whether the concentration is represented by the mole fraction, molality or molarity.

Temperature and pressure dependence
The pressure dependence of fugacity (at constant temperature) is given by

and is always positive.

The temperature dependence at constant pressure is

where  is the change in molar enthalpy as the gas expands, liquid vaporizes, or solid sublimates into a vacuum.

Since the temperature and entropy are positive,  decreases with increasing temperature.

Measurement
The fugacity can be deduced from measurements of volume as a function of pressure at constant temperature. In that case,

This integral can also be calculated using an equation of state.

The integral can be recast in an alternative form using the compressibility factor

Then

However, in geochemical applications, this principle ceases to be accurate at pressures where metamorphism occurs.

For a gas obeying the van der Waals equation, the explicit formula for the fugacity coefficient is

This formula is difficult to use, since the pressure depends on the molar volume through the equation of state; so one must choose a volume, calculate the pressure, and then use these two values on the right-hand side of the equation.

History
The word fugacity is derived from the Latin fugere, to flee. In the sense of an "escaping tendency", it was introduced to thermodynamics in 1901 by the American chemist Gilbert N. Lewis and popularized in an influential textbook by Lewis and Merle Randall, Thermodynamics and the Free Energy of Chemical Substances, in 1923. The "escaping tendency" referred to the flow of matter between phases and played a similar role to that of temperature in heat flow.

See also

Electrochemical potential
Excess chemical potential
Fugacity capacity
Multimedia fugacity model
Thermodynamic equilibrium

References

Further reading

External links

Video lectures

Thermodynamics, University of Colorado-Boulder, 2011
Introduction to fugacity: Where did it come from?
What is fugacity?
What is fugacity in mixtures?

Physical chemistry
Chemical thermodynamics
Thermodynamic properties
State functions